The blue duck or whio (Hymenolaimus malacorhynchos) is a member of the duck, goose and swan family Anatidae endemic to New Zealand. It is the only member of the genus Hymenolaimus. Its exact taxonomic status is still unresolved, but it appears to be most closely related to the tribe Anatini, the dabbling ducks.

The whio is depicted on the reverse side of the New Zealand $10 banknote.

Taxonomy 
Captain James Cook saw the blue duck in Dusky Sound, South Island, New Zealand, on his second voyage to the south Pacific. In 1777 both Cook and the naturalist Georg Forster mentioned the blue duck in their separate accounts of the voyage. A specimen was described in 1785 by the English ornithologist John Latham in his A General Synopsis of Birds. Latham used the English name, the "soft-billed duck". When in 1789 the German naturalist Johann Friedrich Gmelin revised and expanded Carl Linnaeus's Systema Naturae he included the blue duck and placed it with all the other ducks in the genus Anas. He coined the binomial name Anas malacorhynchos and cited the earlier works. The blue duck is now the only species placed in the genus Hymenolaimus that was introduced specifically for the species by George Robert Gray in 1843. The genus name combines the Ancient Greek humēn, humenos meaning "skin" or "membrane" with laimos meaning "throat". The specific epithet malacorhynchos is also from Ancient Greek and combines malakos meaning "soft" with rhunkhos meaning "bill".

The species has no close relatives. Its taxonomic relationships with other waterfowl species remains uncertain; DNA analysis has placed it as a sister to the South American dabbling ducks (Anatini), but with no close relative. As of 2013, it was commonly listed as incertae sedis but likely within the Anatinae and allied to the Anatini. It was formerly thought to be related to the shelduck tribe.

It is commonly known in New Zealand English by its Māori name Whio, pronounced  , which is an onomatopoeic rendition of the males' call.  Other names may be known by are Mountain Duck or Blue Mountain Duck.

Two subspecies are recognised:
 H. m. hymenolaimus Mathews, 1937 – central, south North Island (New Zealand)
 H. m. malacorhynchos (Gmelin, JF, 1789) – west South Island (New Zealand)

Prior to 2022, the North Island and South Island whio were considered distinct but were not distinguished as subspecies; they were, however, treated as separate management units. However, the populations were defined as distinct subspecies by the International Ornithological Congress in 2022, based on strong genetic divergence and some plumage differences.

Description

Females are smaller than males, weighing , whereas the males weigh . The plumage is a dark slate-grey with a greenish sheen on the head, a chestnut-flecked breast. The outer  are tipped with white and the inner ones have black margins. The plumage of the two sexes are mostly the same, although the female has slightly less chestnut in the chest. The pinkish-white bill has fleshy flaps of skin hanging from the sides of its tip. The beak is green at hatching and develops its final colour eight hours later .

Song 
The male's call is a high-pitched whistle. The female's call is a rattling growl or low-pitched grating notes.

Behaviour
This species is an endemic resident breeder in New Zealand, nesting in hollow logs, small caves and other sheltered spots. It is a rare duck, holding territories on fast flowing mountain rivers. It is a powerful swimmer even in strong currents, but is reluctant to fly. It is difficult to find, but not particularly wary when located.

Diet
The blue duck feeds almost entirely on aquatic invertebrate larvae. A study of blue ducks on the Manganuiateao River in the central North Island found the most common prey items were Chironomidae (midge) and cased caddisfly larvae, although cased caddisfly were less preferred and were only consumed so much because of their abundance. Hydrobiosidae (free-living caddisfly) and Aphrophila neozelandica (crane fly) larvae were also frequently eaten. Other prey included mayfly, Aoteapysche (net-building caddis) and stonefly larvae. The blue duck on occasion take berries and the fruits of shrubs.

Breeding

Blue ducks nest between August and October, laying 4–9 creamy white eggs. The female incubates the eggs for 31 to 32 days and chicks can fly when about 70 days old.

Nesting and egg incubation of four to seven eggs is undertaken by the female while the male stands guard. Nests are shallow, twig, grass and down-lined scrapes in caves, under river-side vegetation or in log-jams, and are therefore very prone to spring floods. For this, and other reasons, their breeding success is extremely variable from one year to the next.

Captivity

Captive North Island whio are held and bred on both main islands of New Zealand, but the progeny are returned to their respective island. South Island whio are held and bred in captivity on the South Island only. All captives are kept by approved and permitted zoological and wildlife facilities as part of the national recovery plan. As part of this current ten-year plan (2009–2019) is the WHIONE program which works with specially trained nose dogs to locate nests. The eggs are removed, and the ducklings hatched and raised in captivity. Later they are conditioned for coordinated release.

Blue ducks were presented to the International Waterfowl Association in the UK in the 1970s along with New Zealand shovelers, New Zealand scaup, and brown teal by The Wildlife Service of New Zealand. The species was maintained in the UK until at least 2012 before dying out; efforts to create the only captive breeding population outside of New Zealand with these ducks ultimately failed when the last two male ducks formed a same-sex relationship with each other instead of with the female that was assigned to them. They have not been known to be exported and maintained anywhere else internationally.

Status
The blue duck is classified as Endangered by the IUCN due to its highly fragmented and shrinking population, and it is listed as Nationally Endangered in the New Zealand Threat Classification System. A 2010 census estimated a total population size of 2,500–3,000 individuals, with a maximum of 1,200 pairs.

The blue duck is a very localised species now threatened by predation from introduced mammals such as stoats, competition for its invertebrate food with introduced trout, and damming of mountain rivers for hydroelectric schemes. Early recovery efforts by scientists, field workers and volunteers have been summarised in a project sponsored by Genesis Energy, the Central North Island Blue Duck Charitable Conservation Trust and the Royal Forest and Bird Protection Society in 2006. In 2009 the New Zealand Department of Conservation started a ten-year recovery programme to protect the species at eight sites using predator control and then re-establish populations throughout their entire former range. Female whio are especially vulnerable to stoats while nesting, and some populations are now 70 percent male. In one study area, clutches of eggs lasted an average of nine days before being destroyed by stoats, and the one brood that hatched was killed the next day.

In 2011 the New Zealand Department of Conservation and Genesis Energy started the Whio Forever Project, a five-year management programme for whio. It will enable the implementation of a national recovery plan that will double the number of fully operational secure blue duck breeding sites throughout New Zealand, and boost pest control efforts.

References

Further reading

External links

ARKive: Images and movies of the Blue Duck (Hymenolaimus malacorhynchos)
BirdLife Species Factsheet.
Blue duck/Whio at the Department of Conservation
TerraNature | New Zealand ecology – Blue duck (Whio)
Blue Duck Project Charitable Trust
Whio Forever Project
Central North Island Blue Duck Trust

blue duck
Tadorninae
Endemic birds of New Zealand
blue duck
blue duck